Marilyn Dondero Loop (born 1951, in Las Vegas, Nevada) is an American politician and a Democratic member of the Nevada Senate since November 2018, representing District 8. She was previously a member of the Nevada Assembly from 2008 to 2014, representing District 5.

Education
Dondero Loop earned her BS in elementary education and her MEd in curriculum and instruction from University of Nevada, Las Vegas.

Elections
2008 – When Republican Assemblywoman Valerie Weber left the Assembly and left the District 5 seat open, Dondero Loop was unopposed for the August 12, 2008 Democratic Primary and won the three-way November 4, 2008 General election with 9,332 votes (51.40%) against Republican nominee Donna Toussaint and Independent candidate Don Woolbright.
2010 – Dondero Loop was unopposed for the June 8, 2010 Democratic Primary and won the November 2, 2010 General election with 7,271 votes (54.09%) against Republican nominee Tim Williams, who had run for an Assembly seat in 2008.
2012 – Dondero Loop was unopposed for the June 12, 2012 Democratic Primary and won the three-way November 6, 2012 General election with 12,200 votes (51.31%) against former Republican Assemblyman Bill Harrington and Independent American candidate Jason Reeves.

Electoral history

References

External links
 Profile at the Nevada Senate
 Campaign site
 

Date of birth missing (living people)
1951 births
Living people
Democratic Party members of the Nevada Assembly
Democratic Party Nevada state senators
People from the Las Vegas Valley
University of Nevada, Las Vegas alumni
Women state legislators in Nevada
21st-century American politicians
21st-century American women politicians